Paedocypris is a genus of tiny cyprinid fish found in swamps and streams on the Southeast Asian islands of Borneo, Sumatra and Bintan.

Paedocypris progenetica has been claimed to be the one of smallest known species of fish in the world.

Species
The  three currently recognized species in this genus are:
 Paedocypris carbunculus Britz & Kottelat, 2008
 Paedocypris micromegethes Kottelat, Britz, H. H. Tan & K. E. Witte, 2006
 Paedocypris progenetica Kottelat, Britz, H. H. Tan & K. E. Witte, 2006

Taxonomy
Two species were discovered and identified by ichthyologists Maurice Kottelat from Switzerland and Tan Heok Hui from the Raffles Museum of Biodiversity Research and the National University of Singapore in 1996. Their osteology was studied by Ralf Britz at London's Natural History Museum. In 1994, the same ichthyologists had already discovered in Sarawak (Malaysian part of Borneo) another miniature species of the same genus Paedocypris. Like P. progenetica, P. micromegethes was found in the slow-flowing blackwater streams and peat swamps.

The genus, Paedocypris, and two species, Paedocypris progenetica and Paedocypris micromegethes, were first described in 2006. Paideios is Greek for children and cypris is Greek for Venus and is a common suffix for cyprinid genera; the gender is feminine. Progenetica (from the word progenetic) is used as an adjective. Micromegethes is Greek for small in size, and is used as a noun in apposition.

Paedocypris is considered a danionin genus by Tyson Roberts. Sundadanio and Paedocypris were found to share a sister group relationship, supporting its close relationship to danionin genera; however, this study included danionins among the subfamily Rasborinae.

Appearance
Their miniature transparent bodies lack the typical features characteristic of adult fish, for instance a bony skull structure around its brain, and it retains the postanal larval fin-fold along the ventral edge of the caudal peduncle, characteristic of fish larvae. They have a unique sexual dimorphism: The males have highly modified pelvic fins, with the first ray terminating with a hook-like projection of keratinized skin, supported by hypertrophied pelvic musculature. Males also have a pad of keratinized skin in front of the pelvic fins. These modified fins are thought to be used to grasp the female during mating, or to keep position over a spawning surface.

Smallest vertebrate
Paedocypris progenetica has been claimed to be the smallest known species of fish and vertebrate in the world, particularly before the description of the frog Paedophryne amauensis in 2012. The smallest mature P. progenetica female is only  in standard length, smaller than the female of any other vertebrate species, including those of P. amauensis.

Male individuals of the anglerfish species Photocorynus spiniceps have been documented to be  at maturity, and thus claimed to be a smaller species.

Habitat and conservation
Paedocypris progenetica lives in the blackwater peat swamps of the Indonesian islands of Sumatra and Bintan. P. micromegethes lives in the peat swamps of Sarawak in northern Borneo, Malaysia. P. carbunculus is found in peat swamps in Central Kalimantan, Borneo, Indonesia. Members of this genus are habitat specialists that only live in acidic water. Within peat swamp forests, they are usually found to inhabit deeper, cooler water layers close to the bottom half of the water columns. They also tend to inhabit shaded areas in which light is usually absent from their environment. Their small size helps them to survive droughts, as they can live in small remaining puddles. However, their small ranges and specialised habitat make them extremely vulnerable to habitat loss, such as drainage of peat swamps and fires, and some populations have already disappeared. It has been speculated that some other miniature fish from the habitat and region may already have become extinct, even before being scientifically described or discovered. In Malaysia alone, it has been estimated that—in addition to Paedocypris—up to 15% of the freshwater fish species are associated with peat swamps, and based on current destruction rates all Bornean and Sumatran peatlands may be gone by 2040.

References

External links
BBC: Is it really the smallest fish after all?
Pharyngula: Paedocypris
Some records in the fish world

 
Cyprinidae genera
Freshwater fish of Asia
Taxa named by Maurice Kottelat